Ukraine competed at the 2002 Winter Olympics in Salt Lake City, United States.

Alpine skiing

Men

Men's combined

Women

Biathlon

Men

Men's 4 × 7.5 km relay

Women

Women's 4 × 7.5 km relay

 1 A penalty loop of 150 metres had to be skied per missed target. 
 2 Starting delay based on 10 km sprint results. 
 3 One minute added per missed target. 
 4 Starting delay based on 7.5 km sprint results.

Bobsleigh

Men

Cross-country skiing

Men
Sprint

Pursuit

 1 Starting delay based on 10 km C. results. 
 C = Classical style, F = Freestyle

Women
Sprint

Pursuit

 2 Starting delay based on 5 km C. results. 
 C = Classical style, F = Freestyle

Figure skating

Men

Women

Pairs

Ice Dancing

Freestyle skiing

Men

Women

Ice hockey

Men's tournament

Preliminary round - Group B
Top team (shaded) advanced to the first round.

Consolation round
9th place match

Team roster

Luge

Men's doubles

Women

Short track speed skating

Men

Ski jumping

Speed skating

Men

Women

References
Official Olympic Reports
 Olympic Winter Games 2002, full results by sports-reference.com

Nations at the 2002 Winter Olympics
2002
Winter Olympics